Ariel Alfonso Uribe Lepe (born 14 February 1999) is a Chilean footballer who plays as a midfielder for Deportes Antofagasta on loan from Mazatlán.

International career
At under-20 level, Uribe represented Chile in both the 2018 South American Games, winning the gold medal, and the 2019 South American Championship.

Personal life
He is cousin of Mario Lepe, a historical player of Universidad Católica.

Career statistics

Club

Notes

Honours
Chile U20
 South American Games Gold medal: 2018

References

1999 births
Living people
Sportspeople from Valparaíso
Chilean footballers
Chilean expatriate footballers
Chile under-20 international footballers
Association football midfielders
Santiago Wanderers footballers
Atlético Morelia players
Mazatlán F.C. footballers
C.D. Antofagasta footballers
Chilean Primera División players
Liga MX players
Chilean expatriate sportspeople in Mexico
Expatriate footballers in Mexico